Holyrood Episcopal Church is a Protestant Episcopal Church located at 715 West 179th Street in the Washington Heights neighborhood in upper Manhattan, New York City.

History
The church was founded in 1893 by the Rev. William Oliver Embury, who served as chaplain of the nearby House of Refuge for Problem Girls, and was operated by the Episcopal religious order, the Community of St. Mary, in what is now Inwood Hill Park at a time when upper Manhattan was an area of country houses located beyond the edge of the city. The congregation's first building, in country gothic style, was designed by R.D. Chandler and erected in 1895 on Broadway at what is now 181st Street.   1895, a country-style church with a tower designed by R.D. Chandler and built on upper Broadway at what is now 181st Street. The area urbanized rapidly, and in 1910 the congregation began to plan a new, larger Gothic revival building at Fort Washington Avenue and 179th Street. Designed Bannister & Schell, it was ready for occupancy in 1914.  The building was listed on the National Register of Historic Places in 2020 and designated as a New York City landmark in 2021.

The Rev. Gustav Cartensen was rector from 1919 to 1927. He came to Holyrood after his liberal positions on issues such as permitting black children from a nearby "Negro orphan asylum" led to his resignation from the pulpit of Christ Church (Bronx, New York) at the request of members of the vestry. He was then invited to take the pulpit at Holyrood where his "liberal" positions garnered "widespread publicity," according to The New York Times.

In 2017 the church took a humanitarian position when it agreed to grant "sanctuary" to a Guatemalan refugee scheduled for deportation. The woman is officially regarded as a "fugitive" by U.S. Immigration and Customs Enforcement.

References

External links
 

Churches completed in 1914
Churches in Manhattan
Washington Heights, Manhattan
19th-century Episcopal church buildings
Religious organizations established in 1893
Gothic Revival church buildings in New York City
1893 establishments in New York (state)
National Register of Historic Places in Manhattan
New York City Designated Landmarks in Manhattan